Jaisinghpur is a small town and  subdivision in Kangra district of Himachal Pradesh, India. There are two tehsils: the main tehsil is in Jaisinghpur and the sub tehsil is in Alampur. The population of Jaisinghpur Town is 2,602 and the overall population of Jaisinghpur Sub-Division is 58,623. It was named after Katoch, a Rajput king of the Princely estate of Kangra-Lambagraon, Col. His Highness Maharaja Shri Sir Jai Chand Katoch who ruled from 1864 to 1933. It is situated on the bank of river Beas. It is known for its "Chaugan", which is the term used in Himachal Pradesh for a plain. There are several notable temples in the town such as the Janaki Nath temple, the Radhey Krishan temple near Bus Adda, the Laxmi Narayan temple, the Baba Mani Ram Temple, Baba khadesri kutiya, the Neel Kanth Mahadev Temple, the Dhudu Mahadev Mandir temple, the Guga temple (Called Gangoti near Shitala Mata Mandir), the Shitala Mata temple. There is also a Dargah midtown, popularly known as Baba Shah Mast Ali Dargah, and a Gurudwara on Jaisinghpur Lambagoan road. The Shitala Mata temple is a famous temple of the town on Tinbar-Palampur road. Another famous temple is the Jankinath temple. One of the more notable tourist places is Naguli Naag, which has a swimming pool. Another one is Basanti da Patan near the Beas river where people can go boating.

Festival and fair

Jaisinghpur has been known as the first place in Kangra or perhaps in entire Himachal for staging the Ramlila festival. Ramlila of Jaisinghpur started around 90 years ago and almost all the actors that participated were Brahmin, mainly from the Awasthi community. Pandit Balkishan Awasthi, a native of Jaisinghpur who lived in Mumbai, notable for his work and association with theatre, has brought all the Drama items required for Ramlila from Mumbai and started the Ramlila festival single-handedly at Jaisinghpur. He used to play the role of Ravana and became very popular because of his dialogue delivery and strong deep voice. The uniqueness of the Ramlila was the Sanskrit language used at that time, most Ramlilas in North India are based on the 16th century Avadhi version of Ramayana, Ramcharitmanas, written by Gosvami Tulsidas entirely in verse, thus used as dialogues in most traditional versions.

Jaisinghpur is also famous for its annual fair known as Holian which is celebrated in March during Holi, the festival of colours. The Holian of Jaisinghpur is famous for its delicious Aalu Chholey and Jalebi. Holian continues for almost a week. Holding of Kushti (wrestling) at Dargah during Holi is an annual affair spectated by multiple visitors.

Nature and agriculture

There are many natural water resources in the town. Baayein near PWD Rest House and Naoun are favorite places among the youth in summer, however, it serves as the major water source for the people of Jaisinghpur. It was also famous for its vegetable production on the banks of Beas river. The spot is popularly known as Bhuare ke Bagh. Nowadays the growing of crops, including vegetables, has been stopped in Jainsinghpur and the entire adjoining area because of the increase of stray animals, monkeys, wild pigs, rabbits, deers (Kakkar, Barahsinga and Neel Gaye), which spoil the crops.

The menace of wild and stray animals has increased nowadays. A possible cause is the decrease of tigers/leopards due to local poachers as these predators were responsible for keeping such animals under control.

Demographics
According to the 2001 India census, the population of Jaisinghpur town is 1,273 and the overall population of Jaisinghpur tehsil is 58,623. This number represents 26,666 males and 31,957 females.

Education

Schools

Pathshala, the primary school near Sheetla Mata Mandir, was the oldest school of Jaisinghpur. Initially, it was a primary school only and students had to join high school at Lambagaon after finishing their primary education. Since approx. 2005-2010 this school has been closed.

At present (early 21st century) the Govt. Sr. Secondary School conducting science as well as humanity classes is the biggest school in the area. This was a middle school up to 1969 and high school up to 1986, after which it was upgraded to Sr. Secondary School.

Some private schools opened in recent years which are B.K Public Sr. Sec. School, Aim Academy Sr. Sec School, The Lawrence International School (first CBSE).

Colleges
Government Degree College Jaisinghpur
The Lawrence College Jaisinghpur
Jaggi Institute of Technology
PR Education Point (Tinbar-Majhera) Tehsil Jaisinghpur, Kangra HP 176076

Places of interest 

The temples of Bijapur, JanakiNath, and Baba Mani Ram temple are of similar design indicating that they were constructed in the same era (approx. 500 years old). They are religious places of Jaisinghpur to visit.

Bijapur is the adjoining village of Jaisinghpur which is famous as the birthplace of Maharaja Sansar Chand, the 18th century King of erstwhile Kangra State. There are still the remains of three-storey Mahal of Maharaj which have turned into ruins now but one can just judge how prosperous people of that time lived in this Palace. One marble stone is engraved with "Birth Place of Mahraja Sansar Chand-1765 A.D." Maharani Tara Devi the fourth wife of Maharaja Hari Singh of Jammu & Kashmir and the mother of Scholar, Congress M.P. Karan Singh is also from this royal family of Bijapur. The other major attraction of Bijapur is more than 500 years Sita Ram Mandir. The statues of god Rama, Laxman and Sita and Hanuman outside the temple are worth seeing as well. The broken arm of Shri Hanuman Ji which is reported to have broken by the then Muslim invaders but who could not break the temple is still lying on the feet of Hanuman statue. There are small structures of concrete all around this village which tell how fortified the village would have been for the security of the then Kings.

One can enjoy boat riding which at Basanti which is the source of crossing river Beas. Several migratory waterbirds such Siberian Crayons (Saras) etc. can be seen near the river all around.

There is Ardaa Baba Mandir near the forests of Sandalwood in Netru village, which is very very old and people pay respect to Baba on every occasion. The other attractions are forests of sandalwood of Netru (4 km from Jaisinghpur) which are being stolen by local thieves nowadays.
 
Kunjeshwar Mahadev Temple which is another very old temple and Palace of King (Saradkhana) are other attractions in Lower Lambagaon.

The Ashapuri temple is a religious place of area and scenic view of whole Changer area from the heights of this temple is worth watching.

For staying in Jaisinghpur the only place is the Govt Rest House which may be booked through local Executive Engineer of PWD at very nominal rates.

Cities and villages in Jaisinghpur Tehsil

References

External links 
 Detailed BLOG on JAISINGHPUR.
 

Cities and towns in Kangra district